Germanos III of Old Patras (1771–1826), born Georgios Gotzias, was an Orthodox Metropolitan of Patras. He played an important role in the Greek Revolution of 1821, having diplomatic and political activity.

Germanos was born in Dimitsana, northwestern Arcadia, Peloponnese. Before his consecration as Metropolitan of Patras by Patriarch Gregory V, he had served as a priest and Protosyngellus in Smyrna.

Greek Revolution
According to tradition and several written sources, on March 25 (6 April, Greg.Calendar), the  Feast of Annunciation, 1821, Bishop Germanos proclaimed the national uprising against the Ottoman Empire and blessed the flag of the revolution at the Monastery of Agia Lavra. Earlier, another revolt of the Greek War of Independence had also been declared on February 21 by Alexandros Ypsilantis in Iaşi, which was crushed by June 1821.

References

1771 births
1826 deaths
19th-century Eastern Orthodox bishops
Greek bishops
Greek people of the Greek War of Independence
Ottoman Greece
Orthodox bishops of Patras
People from Dimitsana